With All Due Respect may refer to:

 With All Due Respect (TV series), a Bloomberg Television series
With All Due Respect (book), the memoirs of Nikki Haley

See also
 All Due Respect (disambiguation)